The 30th Golden Raspberry Awards, or Razzies, were held on March 6, 2010, in Hollywood, California to honor the worst films the film industry had to offer in 2009. The nominations were announced on February 1. Per Razzies tradition, both the nominee announcements and ceremony preceded the corresponding Academy Awards functions by one day. Additional awards for Worst Picture, Actor, and Actress of the Decade honored the worst achievements in film from 2000 to 2009.

After the hosts presented Sandra Bullock as the Worst Actress, one of the presenters parodied Kanye West's controversial protest against Taylor Swift. Then, Bullock appeared to accept her Worst Actress and Worst Couple awards for All About Steve, and even handed out DVD copies of the film to the audience, saying the Razzie voters cast ballots for her just to see if she would appear at the ceremony, in comparison to her Academy Award for Best Actress. Bullock was later asked to return her statue, as she was inadvertently given the original, 30-year-old Razzie Statue, as opposed to the replicas handed out to winners. She went on to win the Academy Award for Best Actress for her role in The Blind Side the following night, making her the first actress to win both a Razzie and an Academy Award in 24 hours, and third person overall, after composer Alan Menken (in 1993) and screenwriter Brian Helgeland (in 1998).

Also appearing in person to accept an award was screenwriter J.D. Shapiro, who co-wrote Battlefield Earth, chosen as Worst Picture of the Decade.

Winners and nominees

Worst of the Decade

Films with multiple nominations 
These films received multiple nominations:

See also
 2009 in film
 82nd Academy Awards
 67th Golden Globe Awards
 16th Screen Actors Guild Awards

References

Razzie Awards
2010 in American cinema
Golden Raspberry Awards ceremonies
2010 in California
March 2010 events in the United States
Golden Raspberry